Noriyuki (written: 紀之, 紀行, 敬之, 記之, 徳行, 憲幸, 範之 or 範幸) is a masculine Japanese given name. Notable people with the name include:

, Japanese anime director
, Japanese musician
, Japanese motorcycle racer
, Japanese singer and actor
, Japanese sumo wrestler
, Japanese video game composer
, Japanese figure skater
, Japanese singer-songwriter
, Japanese footballer
, Japanese fencer
, Japanese basketball player
Noriyuki "Pat" Morita (1932–2005), American actor

Japanese masculine given names